Erich Erichsen (31 March 1752 – 7 January 1837) was a Danish merchant and ship-owner. He owned the trading house C. S. Blacks Enke & Co. from 1783. The Erichsen Mansion in Copenhagen is named after him.

Early life and education
Erichsen was born in Odense, the son of war and district commissioner and chamberlain Laurids Erichsen (1716–1756) and Charlotte Christiane von Westen (1724–1801). He completed a merchant's apprenticeship in Copenhagen.

Career
After completing his apprenticeship, Erichsen was employed in the Blach trading house.  He became part of the management of the company after C. S. Blach's death in 1781. He married Blach's widow in 1783 and thus became the owner of the company that changed its name to C. S. Blachs Enke & Co. He was also involved in money lending. His ships brought spices and precious textiles home from the East Indies and transported grain from the Baltic countries to England. His fleet consisted of 13 ships in 1797.

Erichsen's shipping enterprise encountered adversities after circa 1800. Several of his ships were captured by privateers. Erichsen responded by increasingly engaging in banking. He provided the Danish government with huge loans in 1808–1812 and again in 1819 and the 1820s.

Erichsen's brother Peter Erichsen was a partner in the company for many years. His sons joined it in 1816. It went bankrupt in 1833.

Erichsen was a member of Danish Asiatic Company's board of directors from 1783 to 1792. He was managing director of Speciesbanken from 1791 to 1813 and a member of the board of representatives of the National Bank from 1818 to 1825.

He was a member of the Council of 32 Men in 1788–1806 and was president of Grosserer-Societet from its foundation in 1817.

Property
 
Erichsen constructed the Erichsen Mansion at Holmens Kanal in 1799–1801. He also constructed the country house Hellerupgaard to design by Joseph-Jacques Ramée.

In 1807, Blach & Co. owned a warehouse at present-day Bådsmandsstræde 6/Overgaden neden Vandet 51s in Christianshavn and another warehouse at Christianshavns Voldgade 1-3/Overgaden oven Vandet 2 and 2 A.

References

External links

 Erich Erichsen at geni.com

18th-century Danish businesspeople
19th-century Danish businesspeople
Danish Asiatic Company people
Danish bankers
Danish merchants
Danish businesspeople in shipping
People from Odense
1762 births
1837 deaths